The women's freestyle 57 kilograms is a competition featured at the 2021 U23 World Wrestling Championships, and was held in Belgrade, Serbia  on 4 and 5 November.

Medalists

Results
Legend
F — Won by fall

Main bracket

Repechage

References

External links
Official website

Women's freestyle 57 kg
2021 in women's sport wrestling